Muntazir is a Pakistani drama television series that premiered on 26 August 2016 on Play Entertainment. It features Anum Fayyaz, Hassan Niazi, Javed Sheikh, Hina Khawaja Bayat and Ghana Ali.  Most of the filming has been done in the rural and urban areas of Bahawalpur including Islamia University. The OST of the series was performed by Shumaila Hussain.

Cast 
 Anum Fayyaz as Ayesha
 Hassan Niazi as Bilal
 Sabeeka Imam as Kiran
 Jawed Sheikh
 Hina Khawaja Bayat
 Shaheen Khan
 Ghana Ali
 Reesham Naqvi

References 

Pakistani television series
2016 Pakistani television series debuts